The Society for Science and the Public founded its Interlingua Division in 1953. The division made scientific research accessible to a wide audience by translating abstracts and several larger scientific works into Interlingua. The Interlingua Division also made publications of the International Auxiliary Language Association (IALA) available, facilitated contacts among professionals of the same discipline, and opened IALA's extensive library, which included technical and general dictionaries, to the public at no cost. Society for Science and the Public hired Alexander Gode as the division Director; Hugh E. Blair was his assistant.

References

Interlingua